The Huarochirí manuscript (in modern Quechua spelling: Waruchiri) is a text in Classical Quechua from the late 16th century, describing myths, religious notions and traditions of the Indians of Huarochirí Province. The main roles in the myth are played by mountain deities (Huacas), including the rivals Paryaqaqa and Wallallu Qarwinchu, who also act as protectors of regional ethnicities (Huarochirí, Huanca). This text is an important monument of early colonial Quechua literature, because it is unique in its detailed description of the traditional beliefs of the indigenous Andean population of the former Inca Empire. It has been described as 'the closest thing to an Andean bible'.

Author, purpose, and rediscovery 

The name of the original Indigenous author is unknown, but the document was recorded and annotated by the Cuzco-born cleric Francisco de Ávila, who was responsible for the eradication of pagan beliefs.  It is therefore considered ironic that the manuscript now preserves these beliefs,. For centuries, the manuscript was forgotten in the royal library of Madrid. German ethnologist Hermann Trimborn discovered the document in Madrid, translated it into German and published a bilingual edition in 1939. Most of it was destroyed in the Second World War. An expanded and re-worked edition in collaboration with Antje Kelm was published in 1967. In 1966, Peruvian writer and anthropologist José María Arguedas translated the text into Spanish for the first time and also published a bilingual edition (Quechua and Spanish).

Content 

The manuscript contains 31 chapters.

Chapter 1 

The first chapter records the sequence of principal huacas. Huacas would battle for this title, which allowed them to transmit life force to humans. The first huacas mentioned are the ancient Yanañamca and Tutañamca, of which little is known. They were overthrown by Huallallo Carhuincho, who was the first to transmit life force to humans. In his time, the region had red and yellow parrots, the harvest could take place five days after sowing, and people would come back to life five days after dying. This reincarnation meant that the population grew rapidly and people had to migrate into the mountains to find a place to live. Huallallo only allowed two children per family, one of which he would eat.

Huallallo was deposed by the Pariacaca and banished to the region of the Antis along with his parrots. Nearly all of the rest of the manuscript is about the life of Pariacaca. He was the principal Huaca when the Incas first arrived in the region.

The Incas also introduced other huacas, one of which, Cuniraya Huiracocha, is also mentioned in the first chapter of the manuscript. He was combination of a local huaca, Cuniraya, and Huiracocha, who was the Incan creator God, widely known but not universally venerated. This syncretism allowed the Incas to expand their influence. Later in the manuscript, it is argued that, as Huiracocha was the creator god, he must be father of Pariacaca.

Chapter 2 

This chapter features themes encountered in many mythologies: omnipotent gods and pregnant virgins. It begins with an itinerant Cuniraya disguised as a beggar. Prompted by other huacas' scorn for his appearance, he miraculously tills the fields and construct andenes merely by speaking, and digs irrigation ditches with the brush of a reed flower. This humiliates the other huacas.

One day he encountered, Cahuillan, a beautiful virgin. She was desired by all the huacas, whose advances she rejected. One day, seated below a lúcuma tree. Cuniraya transforms into a bird and inseminates a ripe fruit of the tree, which he lets falls beside Cahuillan. She eats the fruit and becomes pregnant. Once the baby, a boy, was born and started to crawl, Cahuillan gathered the huacas to ask which was the father. None volunteered himself, and the disguised Cuniraya was overlooked. Cahuillan allowed the child to crawl freely, reasoning that he would find his father, and he went to Cunirayan. Cahuillan was dismayed to have given birth to the child of an apparently lowly man. She picked up the child and fled in the direction of the ocean. Cuniraya revealed his true self, illuminating the land, but Cahuillan, facing away, did not notice.

Cuniraya started to chase after Cahuillan, speaking to various animals. He blessed those giving encouragement, and curses those who were not supportive: the condor was blessed to eat all dead animals, and to cause animals which ate it to die; the female skunk was cursed to walk at night, hated and stinking; the puma was blessed to eat the llamas of humans, and be honoured by festivities and sacrifices if killed by them; the fox was cursed to be hated by humans and discarded when killed; the falcon was blessed to be lucky, to eat hummingbirds, and to be wept over and offered sacrifices if killed; the parrot was cursed to constantly shriek.

Finally Cuniraya reached the coast, near the temple of Pachacamac, but neither Cahuillan nor her son were there; they had become two islands, which remain to this day. This was considered an excellent fate. Cuniraya went to the temple, where two of his daughters remained, guarded by a snake while their mother visited the new islands. Cuniraya, angry that the mother was visiting the islands that had escaped his reach, raped the elder daughter, and tried to rape the younger, but she escaped by transforming into a dove and fleeing. Cuniraya then populated a local lake with the first fish, which he released into the ocean.

When the mother returned and was informed by her daughters what had happened, she pursued Cuniraya. She told him that she wished to remove fleas from him, hoping to trick him and strike him with a rock. Cuniraya realised the ploy and left on the pretext of going to the toilet, escaping to other lands.

Chapter 3 

Chapters 3 and 4 tell stories of the most ancient humans, before the time of Pariacaca. They contain themes familiar to the Catholics who produced the manuscript: surviving the great flood, as in the story of Noah's Ark, and a period of darkness, like that which followed the death of Jesus.

In chapter 3, all the animals had a presentiment that the ocean was going to overflow, and so they began to migrate to higher altitudes. The central character is a llama, who was unable to migrate because it was being led by its owner. The concerned llama refused to eat, despite having good pasture. The frustrated owner threw a deseeded cob (coronta) of choclo corn at it, and commanded it to eat. The angry llama became capable of speech, and explained that the world would end in five days' time. He commanded that his master pack food for five days and carry him to the mountain Huillcacoto.

As soon as they arrived at the mountain, where all the animals had congregated, the ocean flooded over the land, submerging everything but the peak of Huillcacoto. This became so crowded that the fox's tail dipped in the water, explaining why it is black. All the other humans were killed by the flood. (It is not mentioned whether a female human also survived). After five days, the water subsided, and the animals spread out and repopulated the Earth.

Chapter 4 

The fourth chapter begins with the 'death' of the Sun. There were five days of complete darkness. Rocks began to move themselves and knock together. Even the batans and mortars came to life and consumed humans. Llamas began to pursue humans. The rebellion of animals and objects is also a theme of Moche iconography, which predates the manuscript by a millennium.

Chapter 5 

This chapter discusses the birth of Pariacaca. Before his birth, the world was consumed by chaos and conflict, and the people lived under deceptive leaders. Tantañamca pretended to be a wise huaca to gain power and wealth. He lived in a house covered by parrot wings, and owned blue, red and yellow llamas. Nonetheless, he fell sick. It happened that a poor, humble man, Huatiacuri, passed by on the path from the ocean. He was heading for the mountain Condorcoto to witness the birth of Pariacaca his father (a strange concept, not explained in the text). While Huatiacuri rested, he overheard a conversation between two foxes, one from the mountains and one from the coast. He heard about the false huaca's incurable illness. The mountain fox went on to reveal the strange cause of Tantañamca's illness: in his house, a grain of maize flew out of a cooking pot and touched his wife's genitals. The wife, not realising this, went on to feed the maize to another man. This 'indirect adultery' brought a plague on the house: snakes living in the roof, and a two-headed toad living beneath the batán, both sapping Tantañamca's energy.

Armed with this information, Huatiacuri approached the house and asked if any within had illnesses in need of a cure. The youngest daughter of Tantañamca, Chaupiñamca, told him about her father's illness, and he replied that he would cure it, but only if she would be his partner. She relayed this information to her father, who accepted the offer, despite his advisors, who mocked the unassuming Huatiacuri. The offer, and its acceptance, enraged the husband of Tantañamca's oldest daughter, who didn't want a poor man to join the family. Nonetheless, Huatiacuri proceeded to tell them about the serpents and the toad, and how they had been brought by Tantañamca's wife's 'infidelity'. The wife denied this until Huatiacuri explained the circumstance of the grain of maize, which she remembered. Tantañamca ordered for the house to be destroyed and the serpents killed. As they lifted the batán, the two-headed toad flew away towards a spring, said to cause men to disappear. (The author of the manuscript noted to himself that they should try to find the location of this spring.)

Huatiacuri then reprimanded Tantañamca for pretending to be a huaca, and tried to convince him to instead accept Pariacaca. Naturally, Huatiacuri then remembered the purpose of his journey—to witness the birth of Pariacaca—and hurriedly resumed his journey, now accompanied by Chaupiñamca. At last, they found Pariacaca, in the form of five eggs.

Huatiacuri and Chaupiñamca then slept together, further displeasing the husband of Chaupiñamca's sister. He began to formulate a plan to undo Huatiacuri; to cause him to fall from grace.

Literature / Editions 
 Hermann Trimborn: Dämonen und Zauber im Inkareich. Quellen und Forschungen zur Geschichte der Völkerkunde, Leipzig 1939.
 Hermann Trimborn, Antje Kelm: Götter und Kulte in Huarochirí. Quellenwerke zur alten Geschichte Amerikas aufgezeichnet in den Sprachen der Eingeborenen, Band 8. Verlag Mann, 1967.
 José María Arguedas: Dioses y Hombres de Huarochirí (1966). Quechua text with Spanish translation
 Huarochirí – An Andean Society Under Inca and Spanish Rule. Author: Karen Spalding (1984)
 Gérald Taylor: Rites et Traditions de Huarochirí. (1995)
 Frank Salomon,  George L. Urioste: Huarochirí Manuscript: A Testament of Ancient and Colonial Andean Religion (1991). [Quechua original and English translation by Frank Salomon and George L. Urioste]

References

External links 
 Parts of the text in Quechua
 Gods and men of y Huarochirí (the first four chapters of the Spanish translation by José María Arguedas)
 Huarochirí, a Peruvian Culture in Time.
 Salomon F. The Huarochirí Manuscript. A Testament of Ancient and Colonial Andean Religion. Introductory Essay.
  Leónllerna L. Historia, lenguaje y naración en el Manuscrito de Huarochirí.
 A series of narrated videos (in Spanish) explaining the Huarochirí Manuscript.

Inca Empire
16th-century manuscripts
1939 archaeological discoveries
Inca mythology